Hilton, Paris may refer to:

 Paris Hilton, an American television personality and heiress
 The  hotel in Paris, France (opened 2015), or one of the former Hilton Hotels & Resorts in Paris:
 the Hilton Paris, opened 1967, sold in 2009 to Accor, currently operating as Pullman Tour Eiffel
 the Hilton Arc de Triomphe (2004-2012), currently Hôtel du Collectionneur